The Desert of Mount Athos is a geographical area of Mount Athos that corresponds to the southern slopes of Mount Athos. Located along the southernmost coast of the Athos peninsula, it stretches roughly from Katounakia in the west to Vigla in the east. The Desert of Mount Athos has been a center of Christian asceticism and hesychasm for over 1,000 years.

The area is not literally a desert biome, but was named after the Scetis and Nitrian Deserts of Lower Egypt, where the Egyptian Desert Fathers had lived as monks and ascetics during Late Antiquity. Most of the area is covered with sclerophyllous scrub vegetation and mixed broadleaf deciduous and evergreen forests. Unlike the rest of Mount Athos where motor vehicles are regularly used, transportation within the Desert of Mount Athos can only be done by foot or with mules on the various rocky footpaths in the area.

Settlements
From east to west, settlements located within the Desert of Mount Athos include:
Vigla
Agios Nilos
Kafsokalyvia
Kerasia
Hermitage of Saint Basil
Katounakia
Karoulia

There are various monastic cells scattered across the Desert of Mount Athos that are primarily inhabited by Greek, Russian, and Romanian hermits.

The peak of Karmilio Oros (887 m, located near the Hermitage of Saint Basil) is also located within the Desert of Mount Athos.

See also
Desert Fathers
Nitrian Desert
Scetis
Footpaths of Mount Athos

References

Mount Athos
Places associated with hesychasm
Car-free zones in Europe